"Your Eyes" is the debut single by season five second runner-up of The X Factor Australia, Jai Waetford. It was released digitally by Sony Music Australia on 1 November 2013 as the lead single from his debut EP Jai Waetford (2013). The song peaked at number six on the ARIA Singles Chart and was certified Gold by the Australian Recording Industry Association for selling over 35,000 copies.

Background and release
"Your Eyes" was written by Louis Schoorl, Hayley Warner and Alex Hope, and produced by Schoorl. It would have been Waetford's winner's single for the fifth season of The X Factor, if he had won the show. However, Waetford finished in third place. On 1 November 2013, it was announced that Waetford signed a recording contract with Sony Music Australia, and "Your Eyes" was released digitally as his debut single later that day. A CD single will be released on 8 November. The song debuted and peaked at number six on the ARIA Singles Chart on 9 November 2013.

Live performances
Waetford performed "Your Eyes" live for the first time during The X Factor grand final performance show on 27 October 2013.

Track listing

Charts

Weekly charts

Year-end charts

Certifications

Release history

References

2013 songs
Jai Waetford songs
2013 debut singles
Songs written by Louis Schoorl
Songs written by Hayley Warner
Songs written by Alex Hope (songwriter)
Sony Music Australia singles